Nancy Snyder (born December 2, 1949) is an American actress who won the Clarence Derwent Award in 1976 and the Outer Critics Circle Best Actress award in the 1977–78 season.

Life and career

Snyder was born in Kankakee, Illinois, the daughter of Idelle ( Bonham) and John Marshall Snyder Sr., a director of research. She opened in Jules Feiffer's comedy, Knock Knock, and went on to win the Clarence Derwent Award for the "most promising female [actor] on the metropolitan scene" for the 1975–76 season.

She won Best Actress in the 1977–78 season in the annual awards given by the Outer Critics Circle for her role in Fifth of July. From 1978–1983, she was a regular on the ABC soap opera, One Life to Live, playing a hooker with a heart of gold, Katrina Karr. She appeared in the Lanford Wilson play, Angels Fall, in 1982, which was nominated for a Tony Award, and in Wilson's Book of Days at the Signature Theater in 2002.

During her run on One Life to Live, she met co-star Stephen Schnetzer, who played Marcello Salta on the show. The two have been married since 1982. They have two children, Max and Ben Schnetzer, an actor.

Filmography

Stage
The Gambler by Ugo Betti
Tartuffe by Molière Role: Marianne
Knock, Knock by Jules Feiffer (1976) Role: Joan of Arc
Mrs Murray's Farm by Roy London (1976) Role: Barbara Warren
The Farm by David Storey (1976) Role: Branda
Fifth of July by Lanford Wilson (1978)
Eyes on the Sky by Tom Cone (1978) Role: Elenore Atwater
Angels Fall by Lanford Wilson (1982) Role: Vita Harris
Book of Days by Lanford Wilson (2002)

Film
The Kirlian Witness (1978) Role: Rilla
Texas Rangers (2000) Role: Production Assistant
My Boss's Daughter (2003) Role: Assistant Director

Television
One Life to Live (TV series) Role: Katrina Karr
For Richer, For Poorer (TV series) Role: Colleen Griffin
Father's Choice (TV movie) Role: Assistant Director
Black Top (2001) (TV movie) Role: Office Assistant
Law & Order (2003) (TV series) Role: CeCe Vandeveer

References

External links
 
 Filmography, The New York Times.

1949 births
20th-century American actresses
21st-century American actresses
Actresses from Illinois
American film actresses
American soap opera actresses
American stage actresses
American television actresses
Clarence Derwent Award winners
Living people
People from Kankakee, Illinois